In telecommunication, the term interposition trunk has the following meanings: 

1.  A single direct communication channel, e.g., voice-frequency circuit, between two positions of a large switchboard to facilitate the interconnection of other circuits appearing at the respective switchboard positions. 

2.  Within a technical control facility, a single direct transmission circuit, between positions in a testboard or patch bay, which circuit facilitates testing or patching between the respective positions. 

Communication circuits